The Brandenburg Concertos by Johann Sebastian Bach (BWV 1046–1051), are a collection of six instrumental works presented by Bach to Christian Ludwig, Margrave of Brandenburg-Schwedt, in 1721 (though probably composed earlier). The original French title is Six Concerts à plusieurs instruments, meaning "Six Concertos for several instruments". Some of them feature several solo instruments in combination. They are widely regarded as some of the best orchestral compositions of the Baroque era.

History 

In 1721, Johann Sebastian Bach compiled a collection of six concertos and presented it to Christian Ludwig, Margrave of Brandenburg-Schwedt, titled Six Concerts à plusieurs instruments (Six Concertos for several instruments). Bach wrote out the music himself rather than leaving it to a copyist. He appears to have selected the six pieces from concertos he had composed over a number of years while Kapellmeister at Köthen, and possibly extending back to his employment at Weimar (1708–17).

Bach's dedication to the Margrave was dated 24 March 1721. Translated from the original French, the first sentence of Bach's dedication reads:

As I had the good fortune a few years ago to be heard by Your Royal Highness, at Your Highness's commands, and as I noticed then that Your Highness took some pleasure in the little talents which Heaven has given me for Music, and as in taking Leave of Your Royal Highness, Your Highness deigned to honour me with the command to send Your Highness some pieces of my Composition: I have in accordance with Your Highness's most gracious orders taken the liberty of rendering my most humble duty to Your Royal Highness with the present Concertos, which I have adapted to several instruments; begging Your Highness most humbly not to judge their imperfection with the rigour of that discriminating and sensitive taste, which everyone knows Him to have for musical works, but rather to take into benign Consideration the profound respect and the most humble obedience which I thus attempt to show Him.

Bach's reference to his scoring the concertos for "several instruments" (Concerts avec plusieurs instruments) is an understatement. Bach used the "widest spectrum of orchestral instruments … in daring combinations", as Christoph Wolff has commented. "Every one of the six concertos set a precedent in scoring, and every one was to remain without parallel." Heinrich Besseler has noted that the overall forces required (leaving aside the first concerto, which was rewritten for a special occasion) tallies exactly with the 17 players Bach had at his disposal in Köthen.

Concertos 

In the overview table, the first column shows the title, the second the key, the third the number in the Bach-Werke-Verzeichnis (BWV), the fourth the prominent instruments (solo).

Concerto No. 1 in F major, BWV 1046 

Title on autograph score: Concerto 1mo à 2 Corni di Caccia, 3 Hautb: è Bassono, Violino Piccolo concertato, 2 Violini, una Viola col Basso Continuo.

Instrumentation: two corni da caccia (natural horns), three oboes, bassoon, violino piccolo, two violins, viola and basso continuo (harpsichord, cello, viola da gamba and/or violone)

Duration: about 22 minutes

The Brandenburg Concerto No. 1, BWV 1046.2 (BWV 1046), is the only one in the collection with four movements. The concerto also exists in an alternative version, Sinfonia BWV 1046.1 (formerly BWV 1046a), which appears to have been composed during Bach's years at Weimar. The Sinfonia, which lacks the third movement entirely, and the Polacca (or Poloinesse, polonaise) from the final movement, appears to have been intended as the opening of the cantata Was mir behagt, ist nur die muntre Jagd, BWV 208. This implies a date of composition possibly as early as the 1713 premiere of the cantata, although it could have been used for a subsequent revival.

The first movement can also be found as the sinfonia of a later cantata Falsche Welt, dir trau ich nicht, BWV 52, but in a version without the piccolo violin that is closer to Sinfonia BWV 1046a. The third movement was used as the opening chorus of the cantata Vereinigte Zwietracht der wechselnden Saiten, BWV 207, where the horns are replaced by trumpets.

Concerto No. 2 in F major, BWV 1047 

Title on autograph score: Concerto 2do à 1 Tromba, 1 Flauto, 1 Hautbois, 1 Violino, concertati, è 2 Violini, 1 Viola è Violone in Ripieno col Violoncello è Basso per il Cembalo.

Concertino: natural trumpet in F, recorder, oboe, violin

Ripieno: two violins, viola, violone, cello and harpsichord (as basso continuo)

Duration: about 13 minutes

The trumpet part is still considered one of the most difficult in the entire repertoire, and was originally written for a clarino specialist, almost certainly the court trumpeter in Köthen, Johann Ludwig Schreiber. After clarino skills were lost in the eighteenth century and before the rise of the historically informed performance movement of the late twentieth century, the part was often played on the piccolo trumpet in B, and occasionally on a French horn.

The clarino does not play in the second movement, as is common practice in baroque era concerti. This is due to its construction, which allows it to play only in major keys. Because concerti often move to a minor key in the second movement, concerti that include the instrument in their first movement and are from the period before the valved trumpet was commonly used usually exclude the trumpet from the second movement.

The first movement of this concerto was chosen as the first musical piece to be played on the Voyager Golden Record, a phonograph record containing a broad sample of Earth's common sounds, languages, and music sent into outer space with the two Voyager probes. The first movement served as a theme for Great Performances in the early-to-mid 1980s, while the third movement served as the theme for William F. Buckley Jr.'s Firing Line; a revival featuring Margaret Hoover also used the first movement.

Recent research has revealed that this concerto is based on a lost chamber music version for quintet called "Concerto da camera in Fa Maggiore" (Chamber Concerto in F major), whose catalogue number is BWV 1047R. It is similar to the orchestral version, in that the trumpet, flute, oboe and solo violin parts are the same, but the orchestra part has been arranged for basso continuo (or piano) by Klaus Hofmann. This reconstructed quintet arrangement is also the very first piano reduction of the 2nd Brandenburg Concerto ever published by Bärenreiter Verlag (Product Number BA 5196).

Concerto No. 3 in G major, BWV 1048 

Title on autograph score: Concerto 3zo à tre Violini, tre Viole, è tre Violoncelli col Basso per il Cembalo.

Instrumentation: three violins, three violas, three cellos, and harpsichord (as basso continuo)

Duration: about 10 minutes

The second movement consists of a single measure with the two chords that make up a 'Phrygian half cadence' and—although there is no direct evidence to support it—it was likely that these chords are meant to surround or follow a cadenza improvised by a harpsichord or violin player. Modern performance approaches range from simply playing the cadence with minimal ornamentation (treating it as a sort of "musical semicolon"), to inserting movements from other works, to cadenzas varying in length from under a minute to over two minutes. Wendy Carlos's three electronic performances (from Switched-On Bach, Switched-On Brandenburgs, and Switched-On Bach 2000) have second movements that are completely different from each other. Occasionally, the third movement from Bach's Sonata for Violin and Continuo in G, BWV 1021 (marked Largo) is substituted for the second movement as it contains an identical 'Phrygian cadence' as the closing chords. The Largo from the Sonata for Violin and Obbligato Harpsichord in G major, BWV 1019, has also been used.

The outer movements use the ritornello form found in many instrumental and vocal works of the time. The first movement can also be found in reworked form as the sinfonia of the cantata Ich liebe den Höchsten von ganzem Gemüte, BWV 174, with the addition of three oboes and two horns.

This concerto is the shortest of the six.

Concerto No. 4 in G major, BWV 1049 

Title on autograph score: Concerto 4to à Violino Principale, due Fiauti d'Echo, due Violini, una Viola è Violone in Ripieno, Violoncello è Continuo.

Concertino: violin and two recorders (described in the original score as "flauti d'echo").

Ripieno: two violins, violas, violone, cellos and basso continuo (harpsichord and/or viola da gamba)

Duration: about 15 minutes and 20 seconds

The violin part in this concerto is extremely virtuosic in the first and third movements. In the second movement, the violin provides a bass when the concertino group plays unaccompanied.

It has been debated what instrument Bach had in mind for the "fiauti d'echo" parts. Nowadays these are usually played on alto recorders, although transverse flutes are sometimes used instead: it is also theorised Bach's original intent may have been the flageolet. In some performances, such as those conducted by Nikolaus Harnoncourt, the two recorders are positioned offstage, thus giving an "echo" effect.

Bach adapted the 4th Brandenburg concerto as a harpsichord concerto, BWV 1057.

Concerto No. 5 in D major, BWV 1050 

Title on autograph score: Concerto 5to à une Traversiere, une Violino principale, une Violino è una Viola in ripieno, Violoncello, Violone è Cembalo concertato.

Concertino: harpsichord, violin, flute

Ripieno: violin, viola, cello and violone

Duration: about 23 minutes

The harpsichord is both a concertino and a ripieno instrument. In the concertino passages the part is obbligato; in the ripieno passages it has a figured bass part and plays continuo.

This concerto makes use of a popular chamber music ensemble of the time (flute, violin, and harpsichord), which Bach used on its own for the middle movement. It is believed that it was written in 1719, to show off a new harpsichord by Michael Mietke which Bach had brought back from Berlin for the Köthen court. It is also thought that Bach wrote it for a competition at Dresden with the French composer and organist Louis Marchand; in the central movement, Bach uses one of Marchand's themes. Marchand fled before the competition could take place, apparently scared off in the face of Bach's great reputation for virtuosity and improvisation.

The concerto is well suited throughout to showing off the qualities of a fine harpsichord and the virtuosity of its player, but especially in the lengthy solo cadenza to the first movement. It seems almost certain that Bach, considered a great organ and harpsichord virtuoso, was the harpsichord soloist at the premiere. Scholars have seen in this work the origins of the solo keyboard concerto as it is the first example of a concerto with a solo keyboard part.

An earlier version, BWV 1050a, exists, and has many small differences from its later cousin, but no major difference in structure or instrumentation. It is dated ca. 1720–21.

Concerto No. 6 in B-flat major, BWV 1051 

Title on autograph score: Concerto 6to a due Viole da Braccio, due Viole da Gamba, Violoncello, Violone e Cembalo.

Instrumentation: two viole da braccio, two viole da gamba, cello, violone, and harpsichord

Duration: about 16 minutes

The absence of violins is unusual. Viola da braccio means the normal viola, and is used here to distinguish it from the viola da gamba. When the work was written in 1721, the viola da gamba was already an old-fashioned instrument: the strong supposition that one viola da gamba part was taken by his employer, Prince Leopold, also points to a likely reason for the concerto's composition—Leopold wished to join his Kapellmeister playing music. This is supported by the knowledge that Bach wished to end his tenure under Prince Leopold. By upsetting the balance of the musical roles, he would be released from his servitude as Kapellmeister and allowed to seek employment elsewhere.

The two violas start the first movement with a vigorous subject in close canon, and as the movement progresses, the other instruments are gradually drawn into the seemingly uninterrupted steady flow of melodic invention which shows the composer's mastery of polyphony. The two violas da gamba are silent in the second movement, leaving the texture of a trio sonata for two violas and continuo, although the cello has a decorated version of the continuo bass line. In the last movement, the spirit of the gigue underlies everything, as it did in the finale of the fifth concerto.

Reception
Because King Frederick William I of Prussia was not a significant patron of the arts, Christian Ludwig seems to have lacked the musicians in his Berlin ensemble to perform the concertos. The full score was left unused in the Margrave's library until his death in 1734, when it was sold for 24 groschen (as of 2014, about US$24) of silver. The autograph manuscript of the concertos was only rediscovered in the archives of Brandenburg by Siegfried Wilhelm Dehn in 1849; the concertos were first published in the following year.

The manuscript was nearly lost in World War II, when being transported for safekeeping to Prussia by train in the care of a librarian. The train came under aerial bombardment, and the librarian escaped from the train to the nearby forest, with the scores hidden under his coat.

In the modern era these works have been performed by orchestras with the string parts each played by a number of players, under the batons of, for example, Karl Richter and Herbert von Karajan. They have also been performed as chamber music, with one instrument per part, especially by groups using "baroque instruments" and historically informed techniques and practice. There is also an arrangement for four-hand piano duet by composer Max Reger.

A Karl Richter recording was sent into space in 1977 on the Voyager Golden Record.

In 2001, the piece came in at number 22 in the Classic 100 Original (ABC) listing. In 2007, all six of the concertos appeared on the Classic 100 Concerto (ABC) listing.

References

Further reading

External links 
Scores

Essays
classicalnotes.net: Brandenburg Concertos – Comprehensive discussion by Peter Gutmann including assessment of recordings
Inkpot: The Brandenburg Concertos – An introduction by Benjamin Chee
good-music-guide.com: Brandenburg Concertos – Introductory survey

Recordings
List of recordings, with reviews, from jsbach.org
Brandenburg Concerto No. 2, Brandenburg Concerto No. 3, Brandenburg Concerto No. 4, Brandenburg Concerto No. 5 and Brandenburg Concerto No. 6, : performances by the Netherlands Bach Society (video and background information)
 High-Definition video of Brandenburg Concertos 3 & 4 performed on original instruments by the ensemble Voices of Music, copyright free for use in classrooms

1721 compositions
Compositions in F major
Compositions in G major
Compositions in D major
Compositions in B-flat major
Compositions for trumpet
Compositions for viola
Compositions for horn
Compositions for bassoon
Compositions for cello
Compositions for flute
Compositions for oboe
Concerti grossi
Concertos by Johann Sebastian Bach
Harpsichord concertos
Bach
Köthen (Anhalt)
Contents of the Voyager Golden Record
Concertos for multiple instruments